There were two formations known as the 6th Guards Tank Brigade which served during World War II:
the 6th Guards Tank Brigade (United Kingdom)
the 6th Guards Tank Brigade of the Red Army, which served with the 13th Tank Corps and the 19th Tank Corps